Annie V O'Neil (born 18 February 1999) is an Australian cricketer who plays as a right-handed batter for the South Australian Scorpions in the Women's National Cricket League (WNCL) and the Adelaide Strikers in the Women's Big Bash League (WBBL). She played in one match for the Strikers in the 2020–21 Women's Big Bash League season.

References

External links

Annie O'Neil at Cricket Australia
Annie O'Neil at Adelaide Strikers

1999 births
Living people
Australian women cricketers
Adelaide Strikers (WBBL) cricketers
Cricketers from South Australia
Place of birth missing (living people)
South Australian Scorpions cricketers